Venancio Pérez García (22 April 1921 – 28 November 1994), known simply as Venancio, was a Spanish footballer who played mainly as a forward.

Early life
From a poor family in Sestao, Biscay, Venancio started working at a young age in the Altos Hornos de Vizcaya factory. Tall and powerfully built, he played pelota mano (an offshoot of Basque pelota) in his youth, and only became a full-time professional footballer at the age of 24.

Club career
Venancio started playing the sport as a hobby, whilst he was performing his military service in Vitoria-Gasteiz. After starting out at SD Erandio Club he signed with Athletic Bilbao in early 1945 for 25.000 pesetas, but appeared sparingly in his first seasons, being loaned to Barakaldo CF from Segunda División.

In February 1949, Venancio was recalled. In his first game upon his return, he scored twice in a 3–0 home win against CD Alcoyano. He finished the campaign with a further five in only six appearances, and went on to be part of one of the most legendary attacking lines in the club's history alongside Agustín Gaínza, Rafael Iriondo, José Luis Panizo and Telmo Zarra, winning four titles which included three Copa del Generalísimo.

Venancio left the San Mamés Stadium in 1955, aged 34, retiring after a spell in the second tier with former team Barakaldo. With his main club, he amassed overall totals of 208 games and 91 goals over one decade, and was often deployed as a central defender in his last years.

International career
Venancio earned 11 caps for Spain in slightly less than five years. His debut came on 12 June 1949, in a 4–1 friendly win over the Republic of Ireland in Dublin.

On 6 January 1954, Venancio scored the last of his four goals for the country to help to a 4–1 defeat of Turkey for the 1954 FIFA World Cup qualifiers, but the opposition would eventually reach the finals in Switzerland after a drawing of lots.

Post-retirement and death
After retiring, Venancio settled in Bilbao and opened a metal shop. Married with two sons, he died in San Sebastián on 28 November 1994, at 73.

Honours
Athletic Bilbao
Copa del Generalísimo: 1945, 1950, 1955
Copa Eva Duarte: 1950

References

External links

1921 births
1994 deaths
People from Sestao
Sportspeople from Biscay
Spanish footballers
Footballers from the Basque Country (autonomous community)
Association football defenders
Association football midfielders
Association football forwards
Association football utility players
La Liga players
Segunda División players
SD Erandio Club players
Athletic Bilbao footballers
Barakaldo CF footballers
Spain international footballers